Scott Russell Cary (April 11, 1923 – February 28, 2011), Nicknamed "Red", was a Major League Baseball pitcher who played for the Washington Senators in 1947. He went 3–1 with a 5.93 earned run average in 23 games as a pitcher, starting 3 games.

Personal
Cary was one of 10 children born to John and Ruby (Riehm) Cary. He was the ace for City Light in 1943, a semipro baseball team in Fort Wayne that also included future Major League Baseball pitchers Harley Hisner and Ned Garver. On January 19, 1946, he married Mary Hurley in Sturgis; they raised six children on a farm in East Gilead.
He was inducted into the Fort Wayne Baseball Hall of Fame in 1977. He was a baseball coach for the Bronson Little League and the Babe Ruth Baseball programs.

References

External links

 Scott Cary's obituary

1923 births
2011 deaths
Baseball players from Indiana
Major League Baseball pitchers
Washington Senators (1901–1960) players
Burlington Bees players
Orlando Senators players
Chattanooga Lookouts players
Charlotte Hornets (baseball) players
People from Kendallville, Indiana
People from Branch County, Michigan
Orlando Nationals players